Chuang Chia-jung and Liang Chen were the defending champions, but Chuang chose not to participate. Liang played alongside Wang Yafan, but lost in the quarterfinals to Xu Shilin and You Xiaodi.

Martina Hingis and Sania Mirza won the title, defeating Xu and You in the final, 6–3, 6–1.

Seeds 
The top seeds received a bye into the Quarterfinals.

Draw

References 
 Draw

2015 WTA Tour
2015 Doubles